SILC can refer to:

 SILC (protocol) (Secure Internet Live Conferencing), a protocol that provides secure conferencing services over the Internet
 Silicom Connectivity Solutions (NASDAQ: SILC), one of the RAD Group Companies
 Solomon Islands Labour Corps, a World War II organization of native Solomon Islanders who served in the allied war effort
 Stress-induced leakage current, an increase in the gate leakage current of a MOSFET, due to defects 
 Sydney Institute of Language and Commerce, a college in Shanghai University
 The summer language program at the American International School-Salzburg
 SILC, Swedish International Liberal Center

See also 
 EU-SILC, European Union Statistics on Income and Living Conditions (or Survey on Income and Living Conditions)